The Pink Line of the Jaipur Metro is part of the rapid transit system in the city of Jaipur, India. It is also called East-West Corridor of Jaipur. It consists of 11 metro stations from Mansarovar in the West to Chaupar in the East.

This is the Metro line that got flagged off on 3 June 2015, and has been named as Pink Line, as the line passes through the Pink City.

The Pink line has planned interchange with the Orange Line of the Jaipur Metro. it also connects Mansarovar, the Largest Colony of Asia with the Jaipur Junction railway station of the Indian Railways and Sindhi Camp Bus Stand.

History
The following dates represent the dates the section opened to the public, not the private inauguration.

Route

Phase-I B extension
Under Phase-I B, the Pink Line was extended further East from Chandpole station by 2.349 km. Two additional stations got built to extend the line to Badi Chaupar. The stations on this extension are:
1) Chhoti Chaupar
2) Badi Chaupar.

The construction of the extension was delayed following the discovery of an ancient stepwell.

Phase-I C extension
For Phase 1C, Jaipur Metro Rail Corporation (JMRC) plans to extend the Pink Line from Badi Chaupar to Transport Nagar. For the same, the corporation has prepared a detailed project report (DPR) of Phase 1C by taking public suggestions. According to the DPR, the estimated project cost will be Rs 856 crore, including cost of land and taxes, The total length of the project will be 2.85km (2.26km Underground and 0.59km Elevated). This project is expected to be completed till March 2025 if the construction takes place. Once constructed, the estimated ridership between the entire stretch, Mansarovar to Transport Nagar, will be over 1.38 lakh till 2031. The stations on this extension are:
1) Badi Chaupar
2) Ramganj Chaupar
3) Transport Nagar

See also

References

External links
 UrbanRail.Net — descriptions of all metro systems in the world, each with a schematic map showing all stations.
 Metromap.in ---  Descriptions of Metro Systems in India, With HD Route Map and Fare Details.

Jaipur Metro lines